Salt Hill or Salthill may refer to:

Salt Hill, a suburb of Slough, England
Salthill, a seaside area of Galway, Ireland
Salthill, a suburb of Dún Laoghaire, Ireland 
Salt Hill (New York), United States, a mountain in Westchester County
Salt Hill, West Virginia, United States, an unincorporated community in Jackson County